Mark Hartnett (born 1960s) is an Australian former professional tennis player.

Hartnett, a top ranked Victorian junior, was trained at the AIS and won the boys' doubles title at the 1982 Australian Open. A left-handed player, he was a contemporary of Pat Cash and often partnered with the future Wimbledon winner in junior tournaments.

Now a tennis coach, Hartnett runs the Pro Tennis Academy in Melbourne with his wife, former player Lisa Keller. He was named Tennis Victoria Coach of the Year in 2003.

ATP Challenger finals

Doubles: 1 (0–1)

References

External links
 
 

1960s births
Living people
Australian male tennis players
Australian Open (tennis) junior champions
Grand Slam (tennis) champions in boys' doubles
Tennis people from Victoria (Australia)